Ng Wing Nam Venus (born 9 August 1992) is a Hong Kong table tennis player. Since 2007, she became a full time athlete in Hong Kong Sports Institute. Her highest career ITTF ranking was 28. She was the first local player to win Asian Championships and World Grand Finals Medalist.

Honours
Hong Kong Sports Stars Awards
 Hong Kong Potential Sports Stars Awards

References

1992 births
Living people
Hong Kong female table tennis players
Asian Games medalists in table tennis
Asian Games bronze medalists for Hong Kong
Table tennis players at the 2014 Asian Games
Table tennis players at the 2018 Asian Games
Medalists at the 2014 Asian Games
Medalists at the 2018 Asian Games
21st-century Hong Kong women